XHTVR-FM 99.5/XETVR-AM 1150 is a combo radio station in Tuxpan, Veracruz. It is known as Vida Azul and carries a Spanish adult contemporary format.

History
XETVR received its concession in 1991. It was authorized to become an AM-FM combo in 1994 on 106.9 MHz.

On February 12, 2020, XHTVR began its move from 106.9 to 99.5 MHz. The move was ordered by the Federal Telecommunications Institute in 2018, as a condition of the renewal of XHTVR's concession, to clear the 106–108 MHz band for community and indigenous stations.

References

Radio stations in Veracruz
Radio stations established in 1991
1991 establishments in Mexico